The Royal Pauper is a 1917 silent film starring Francine Larrimore and Richard Tucker. It was directed by Ben Turbett.

Preserved in the collections of the Library of Congress and UCLA Film & Television Archives.

Cast
 Francine Larrimore as Irene, the Princess
 Walter Bauer as William, The Prince Charming, at 15
 Richard Tucker as William, The Prince Charming, at 21
 William Wadsworth as Muggins, the King
 H.H. Pattee as Mr. Chandler, the Ogre (as Herbert Pattee)
 Nellie Grant as Mrs. Chandler, the Fairy Godmother
 Leo Gordon as Carruthers, the Wicked Suitor
 Helen Strickland as Mrs. Bunty, the Witch
 Charles Sutton as Supt. of the Chandler Mills

References

External links

1917 films
American silent feature films
1917 drama films
Silent American drama films
American black-and-white films
1910s American films